Luis Nery may refer to:

Luis Nery (boxer) (born 1994), Mexican boxer
Luis Nery (model) (born 1978), Venezuelan model
Luis Nery Caballero (born 1990), Paraguayan footballer